Silver Lake is an unincorporated community located at the north end of Silver Lake in the town of Madison, New Hampshire, in Carroll County, New Hampshire, United States. Joy Farm, summer home of E. E. Cummings, is a National Historic Landmark located north of the village.

Silver Lake has a different ZIP code (03875) from the rest of the town of Madison.

References

External links
 Town of Madison, New Hampshire
 Madison Library
 Madison Historical Society

Unincorporated communities in New Hampshire
Unincorporated communities in Carroll County, New Hampshire